The Bristol class of interceptor craft are a series of watercraft built by Bristol Boats, a division of Chika Pvt. Ltd Aroor, for the Indian Coast Guard. These boats are intended for carrying out patrol duties in shallow water areas near the coastline. The contract was signed on 22 March 2004 for acquisition of eight Interceptor Boats by the Indian Coast Guard at a total cost of Rs 3.74 crores. The first craft became operational on 1 December 2004.

Specifications
Displacement: 5.5 tonnes
Length: 
Breath: 
Draught: 
Power: 2 diesel engine, 
Speed: 35 knots
Range: 75 nautical miles at 25 knots
Armament: 1*7.62 mm machine gun
Crew: 2

See also
 Swallow Craft Class
 AMPL Class
 Griffon/Grse Class
 Mandovi Marine Class
 Timblo Class

References

External links

Indian Coast Guard fleet
Bristol Boats official website

Fast attack craft of the Indian Coast Guard
Patrol boat classes